The Hiendertelltihorn is a mountain of the Bernese Alps, located west of Handegg in the canton of Bern. It lies between the Gauli Glacier and the Grueben Glacier.

References

External links
 Hiendertelltihorn on Hikr

Mountains of the Alps
Alpine three-thousanders
Mountains of Switzerland
Mountains of the canton of Bern